Poekilloptera minor is a species of planthopper in the family Flatidae, occurring in Brazil, Colombia and Venezuela.

References

External links
 
 Myers, P., R. Espinosa, C. S. Parr, T. Jones, G. S. Hammond, and T. A. Dewey. 2017. The Animal Diversity Web

Insects described in 1901
Flatidae